The Kentington Resort is a tourist attraction resort in Manzhou Township, Pingtung County, Taiwan.

Architecture
In a 40 hectares area, the resort has 309 huts, dining areas, recreational areas and venues for conferences or banquets.

Transportation
The resort is accessible by bus from Fangliao Station or Kaohsiung Station of Taiwan Railways to Hengchun transfer station, in which Kentington Resort buses can arrange for pickups from the transfer station.

See also
 List of tourist attractions in Taiwan

References

External links
  

Buildings and structures in Pingtung County
Resorts in Taiwan
Tourist attractions in Pingtung County